Metropolis was a town in ancient Doris, Greece, mentioned by Stephanus of Byzantium. Its location is not otherwise known.

References

Doris (Greece)
Cities in ancient Greece
Lost ancient cities and towns